Nico Van Der Linden (born 12 March 1985 in Ekeren) is a Belgian football defender who plays for VC Herentals.

Career
Nico made his debut in Belgian Football with a substitution for K.F.C. Germinal Beerschot in a Belgian First Division game in 2003.

He moved to Belgian Second Division side Verbroedering Geel in 2004. One season later he moved on to Belgian Third Division side Cappellen.

In 2008, he move to K Rupel Boom FC, where in 2009 he extended his contract for an extra season.

Amazingly, for a central defender, he scored 13 goals in the 2009–2010 season, including 4 in the promotion playoffs.

References

External links
 Nico Van Der Linden at Footballdatabase

1985 births
Living people
K. Rupel Boom F.C. players
Belgian footballers
Association football defenders
Royal Cappellen F.C. players
K Beerschot VA players
People from Ekeren
Hoogstraten VV players